Coles County is a county in Illinois. As of the 2020 census, the population was 46,863. Its county seat is Charleston, which is also the home of Eastern Illinois University.

Coles County is part of the Charleston-Mattoon, IL Micropolitan Statistical Area.

History
Coles County was organized by on December 25, 1830, from Clark and Edgar counties. It was named after Edward Coles, the second governor of Illinois, from 1822 to 1826. The majority of the American settlers who founded Coles County were either from the six New England states, or were born in upstate New York to parents who had moved to that region from New England shortly after the American Revolution. They were part of a wave of farmers who headed west into the frontier of the Northwest Territory during the early 1800s. The completion of the Erie Canal led to an increase in such migrants heading west. When these settlers originally reached what is today Coles County, they found dense virgin forest and prairie. 

The New England settlers laid out farms, constructed roads, erected government buildings and established post routes. They brought with them many of their "Yankee" values, such as staunch support for abolitionism as well as a passion for education. They quickly established schools in their communities. They were mostly members of the Congregationalist Church, though some were Episcopalian. As a result of the second Great Awakening, many had become Baptists or switched to Protestant denominations such as Methodism or Presbyterianism before moving to what is now Coles County. The prevalence of settlers with New England heritage resulted in their establishing a culture that was continuous with that of New England for the first several decades of its history. As a result of this, county residents largely supported abolitionism in the antebellum period, and also the Republican Party as of the 1850s and 1860s. 

Beginning in 1849, numerous German immigrants arrived in Coles County, refugees from the rebellions the year before in various principalities. This population overwhelmingly supported the abolition of slavery. 

Irish Catholic immigrants who had fled the famine in their country also settled here. Illinois Democratic Senator Stephen Douglas was extremely popular amongst Irish Catholic immigrants in Coles County at this time. During the Civil War the Irish Catholic community of Coles County would overwhelmingly be Copperheads.

Folklore representation in other media
Coles County has generated several well-known legends and folktales, including the Mad Gasser of Mattoon and accounts of the ghost of Mary Hawkins at Pemberton Hall. Michael Kleen has compiled many of these tales, including the "witch's grave" of St. Omer Cemetery and the story of "Rag Doll Cemetery," in his book Tales of Coles County, Illinois (2010). 

The legend of "Rag Doll Cemetery" was adapted for the screenplay of the independent film Rag Doll, filmed in 2010 primarily in and around Mattoon, Illinois. The novel A Family Possessed (2000) by L. W. Stevenson, is based on a rural family's account of poltergeist activity at their home in the 1980s. 

Ashmore Estates has long been a part of local folklore. Originally serving as the almshouse at the Coles County Poor Farm, it is considered a haunted attraction and a place of interest for paranormal investigators.

Geography

Climate and weather

Adjacent counties
 Douglas County - north
 Edgar County - northeast
 Clark County - southeast
 Cumberland County - south
 Shelby County - southwest
 Moultrie County - west

Major highways
  Interstate 57
  US Route 45
  Illinois Route 16
  Illinois Route 49
  Illinois Route 121
  Illinois Route 130
  Illinois Route 133

Demographics

As of the 2010 United States Census, there were 53,873 people, 21,463 households, and 11,963 families residing in the county. The racial makeup of the county was 92.9% white, 3.8% black or African American, 1.0% Asian, 0.2% American Indian, 0.6% from other races, and 1.5% from two or more races. Those of Hispanic or Latino origin made up 2.1% of the population. In terms of ancestry, 25.6% were German, 16.4% were Irish, 11.1% were American, 10.0% were English, 3.4% were Polish, 2.9% were Italian, 2.5% were French, 2.1% were Dutch and 1.9% were Scots-Irish.

Of the 21,463 households, 25.5% had children under the age of 18 living with them, 41.8% were married couples living together, 9.9% had a female householder with no husband present, 44.3% were non-families, and 31.4% of all households were made up of individuals. The average household size was 2.30 and the average family size was 2.87. The median age was 31.6 years.

The median income for a household in the county was $36,457 and the median income for a family was $54,170. Males had a median income of $38,915 versus $28,781 for females. The per capita income for the county was $20,601. About 10.6% of families and 20.3% of the population were below the poverty line, including 20.6% of those under age 18 and 5.9% of those age 65 or over.

Communities

Cities
 Charleston (seat)
 Mattoon

Villages
 Ashmore
 Humboldt
 Lerna
 Oakland

Unincorporated Communities
 Bushton
 Campbell
 Coles
 Cooks Mills
 Diona
 Dorans
 Embarrass
 Etna
 Fairgrange
 Fuller
 Hutton
 Janesville
 Jones
 Kings
 Lipsey
 Loxa
 Magnet
 Newby
 Paradise
 Rardin
 Trilla
 Wabash Point

Townships
Coles County is divided into these twelve townships:

 Ashmore
 Charleston
 East Oakland
 Humboldt
 Hutton
 Lafayette
 Mattoon
 Morgan
 North Okaw
 Paradise
 Pleasant Grove
 Seven Hickory

Education
 Eastern Illinois University
 Lake Land College
 Lakeview College of Nursing (Charleston)
 Charleston Community Unit School District 1
 Mattoon Community Unit School District 2
 Oakland Community Unit School District 5

Politics
Coles County leans strongly towards the Republican Party in Presidential elections. Although it was carried by Illinoisian Barack Obama in 2008, the GOP regained the county in 2012 and the next presidential elections.

Notable people

 Thomas Lincoln, father of President Abraham Lincoln, moved to Coles County in 1831 and died there in 1851.

See also
 National Register of Historic Places listings in Coles County, Illinois
 List of school districts in Illinois

References

External links
 County website
 Coles County Online Community
 Illinois State Archives
 

 
1830 establishments in Illinois
Charleston–Mattoon, IL Micropolitan Statistical Area
Illinois counties
Populated places established in 1830